The Abu Dhabi Grand Slam Jiu-Jitsu World Tour commonly known as the Abu Dhabi Grand Slam (ADGS) is a series of international Brazilian jiu-jitsu tournaments (Gi and No-gi), taking place every year, organised by the United Arab Emirates Jiu-Jitsu Federation (UAEJJF) and the Abu Dhabi Jiu-Jitsu Pro (AJP) as part of the AJP competition circuit. The events take place in a number of cities around the world.

History 
The Abu Dhabi Grand Slam Jiu-Jitsu Tour (ADGS) was created by the United Arab Emirates Jiu-Jitsu Federation (UAEJJF) in 2015 with the goal of "developing and promoting jiu-jitsu around the world". The ADGS is part of the Abu Dhabi Jiu Jitsu Pro (AJP) Competition Circuit, which represents 78 international events in each season.

The Abu Dhabi Grand Slam features a series of high-level tournaments open  to the world's elite male and female Brazilian jiu-jitsu competitors in the categories of juniors, professionals and masters with cash prizes awarded for the top athletes of each division. Those events, known as Grand Slams, take place each seasons in various host cities.

Abu Dhabi Grand Slam 2015–2016 
For its first season, the UAEJJF implemented 4 grand slam tournaments in four countries (Japan, England, USA and Brazil). Black belt prize money for each Grand Slam was US$49,000 with an additional $7000 submission bonuses spread through the divisions.

Abu Dhabi Grand Slam 2016–2017 
For its second season, the Grand Slam was held in five host cities with the addition of Abu Dhabi.

Abu Dhabi Grand Slam 2017–2018 
For its third season, the Grand Slam included a total prize fund of more than US$800,000.

Abu Dhabi Grand Slam 2018–2019 
For its fourth season combined cash prizes of more than US$800,000 were awarded to the top athletes of each division.

Abu Dhabi Grand Slam 2019–2020 
For the fifth season Moscow was added as a new host city. To minimize the potential spread of the Coronavirus, the UAEJJF ran Grand Slam London as a closed event.

Abu Dhabi Grand Slam 2020–2021 
A total of $1,525,000 prize money was announced available for the course of this season.

Abu Dhabi Grand Slam 2021–2022 
For its seventh season three new locations were added, Miami, Beijing and Sidney. The season will span across five continents and seven different cities. A total of $1,575,000 prize money was announced available for the course of the season.

Abu Dhabi Grand Slam 2022–2023 
A total of $1,525,000 prize money was announced available for the course of the season.

See also 
 UAEJJF weight classes
 Abu Dhabi World Professional Jiu-Jitsu Championship
 ADCC Submission Fighting World Championship

Notes

References 

Brazilian jiu-jitsu competitions